Etc. is a collection of B-sides and rarities by American punk rock band Jawbreaker.

Track listing

References

Jawbreaker (band) albums
2002 compilation albums